The Jiul de Vest ("Western Jiu", previously also known as ) is a headwater of the river Jiu in Romania. At its confluence with the Jiul de Est in Iscroni, the Jiu is formed.

 simply means "the Jiu", appended by the definite article .

Tributaries

The following rivers are tributaries to the river Jiul de Vest (from source to mouth):

Left: Iarului, Scorota, Scocu Urzicaru, Pleșa, Buta, Lazăr, Valea Ursească, Toplița, Pilug, Valea de Brazi, Furu, Valea Șerpilor, Sterminos, Mierleasa, Crevedia, Aninoasa
Right: Șarba, Știrbu, Ursu, Jidanu, Pârâul Rece, Pârâul lui Stan, Valea Boului, Gârbov, Rostovanu, Strugu, Valea de Pești, Pietroasa, Valea Arsă, Pârâul Seciului, Balomir, Tușul, Braia, De La Hagher, Sohodol, Baleia, Pârâul Mare, Merișoara, Valea Ungurului, Pârâul Pinului

References

Rivers of Romania
Rivers of Hunedoara County